"High on the Mountain Top" is an 1850s hymn written by Latter Day Saint hymn writers Joel H. Johnson and Ebenezer Beesley. Originally named "Deseret", it is hymn number 5 in the current LDS Church hymnal.

The lyrics to the hymn were written by Johnson in 1853, five years after Brigham Young preached on Ensign Peak as the Mormon pioneers first arrived in the Salt Lake Valley. Even though Johnson's journal contains more than 700 hymns, "High on the Mountain Top" is his most notable contribution to LDS music.

In 1854, Beesley composed music to accompany Johnson's poem. The Mormon Tabernacle Choir adopted Beesley's rendition and it has since become one of the choir's standard numbers.

The hymn has five verses and centers on the theme that God has restored the gospel to the earth.

References

1853 songs
1853 in Christianity
Latter Day Saint hymns